Mim Strom (born 7 November 2001) is an Australian rules footballer playing for the Fremantle Football Club in the AFL Women's (AFLW). Strom was drafted by Fremantle with their second selection, 21st overall, in the 2019 AFL Women's draft.

Originally from Exmouth, Western Australia, Strom's two older brothers, Zach and Noah, both play in the West Australian Football League (WAFL) for South Fremantle.

References

External links 

Living people
2001 births
Fremantle Football Club (AFLW) players
Australian rules footballers from Western Australia